Cath may refer to:


People
 Cath Bishop (born 1971), British former rower and 2003 world champion
 Cath Carroll (born 1960), British musician and music journalist
 Cath Coffey, one of the earliest members of British rap band Stereo MCs
 Cath Crowley (born 1971), Australian young adult fiction author
 Cath Kidston (born 1958), English fashion designer, businesswoman and author
 Cath Mayo, New Zealand short story writer, novelist and musician
 Cath Rae (born 1985), Scottish field hockey goalkeeper
 Cath Vautier (1902–1989), New Zealand netball player, teacher and sports administrator
 Cath Wallace (born 1952), New Zealand environmentalist and academic

In mythology
Catha (mythology) or Cath, an Etruscan deity
Cath Palug, a feline creature in Welsh mythology

Songs
"Cath...", a Death Cab for Cutie song
"Cath", a hit song by The Bluebells

Other uses
Cath., abbreviation for Catholic
Catheter or catheterization
CATH, protein structure classification

See also 
 Kath (disambiguation)

Feminine given names
Hypocorisms